The 2004 Air Force Falcons football team represented the United States Air Force Academy in the 2004 NCAA Division I-A football season. They were a member of the Mountain West Conference. The Falcons were coached by Fisher DeBerry and played their 2004 season home games at Falcon Stadium. They finished the season 5–6, 3–4 in Mountain West play to finish in a three-way tie for fourth place.

Schedule

Roster
  No Name Pos Ht Wt Yr Hometown (High School)
1 Overton Spence ILB 6–2 240 Jr. Jacksonville, Florida (Andrew Jackson)
2 Carson Bird CB 5–11 185 Fr. Sharpsburg, Georgia (Northgate)
3 Julian Madrid FS 6–0 200 Fr. San Diego, California (St. Augustine)
5 Shaun Carney QB 5–10 195 Fr. North Olmsted, Ohio (St. Edward)
6 Chris Sutton, CB      6–0  190  So.  Longview, Texas (Pine Tree)
7 Nate Allen CB 5–10 180 Sr. Converse, Texas (Judson)
8 Jacobe Kendrick SB 6–0 220 So. Midland, Texas (Midland Lee)
9 Jason Brown WR 6–4 220 Jr. Arvada, Colorado (Arvada West)
10 Adam Zanotti FAL 5–11 200 So. Bay City, Michigan (Bay City Central)
11 Bobby Giannini FS 6–2 210 Fr. Hawthorn Woods, Illinois (Stevenson)
12 Scott Eberle PK 6–1 200 Jr. Winona, Minnesota (Winona)
13 Andy Gray QB 6–2 195 Jr. Phoenix, Arizona (Deer Valley)
14 Lucas Ewing QB 6–0 185 So. Leslie, Michigan (Leslie)
15 Darnell Stephens HB 6–2 205 Sr. Midwest City, Oklahoma (Midwest City)
16 Adam Fitch QB 6–0 190 Jr. Gillette, Wyoming (Campbell County)
18 Justin Handley HB 5–8 175 So. Stone Mountain, Georgia (Dunwoody)
19 Jordan Wilkie CB 5–11 185 Sr. Eagan, Minnesota (Eagan)
20 Dan Shaffer FB 5–11 235 Sr. Lakewood, Colorado (Green Mountain)
21 Mark Carlson FS 6–0 190 Jr. Colorado Springs, Colorado (Santa Fe Christian)
22 Beau Suder FAL 5–11 190 So. Laramie, Wyoming (Laramie)
23 Jason Boman HB 6–1 205 Jr. Broomfield, Colorado (Broomfield)
24 Adam Cole FB 6–0 230 Sr. Dallas, Texas (Richardson)
25 Anthony Butler HB 5–9 200 Sr. San Jose, California (Gunn)
26 Jared Baxley FAL 6–0 195 So. Tampa, Florida (Chamberlain)
27 Denny Poland FAL 6–3 225 Jr. Pittsburgh, Pennsylvania (Central Catholic)
28 David Conley CB 5–10 190 Sr. Mesa, Arizona (Westlake)
29 Chris Huckins CB 5–10 175 So. Covington, New Mexico (Covington)
30 Donny Heaton P 6-2 195 Jr. Waterloo, Iowa (West)
31 John Taibi FAL 6–2 205 Jr. Englewood, Colorado (Cherry Creek)
32 Dominic Rickard FAL 5–10 170 Fr. Huntington Beach, California (Mater Dei)
33 Kris Holstege HB 5–10 190 Sr. Caledonia, Michigan (South Christian)
35 Todd Hadley CB 5–11 185 Jr. Fountain Hills, Arizona (Fountain Hills)
36 Brad Meissen CB 5–11 185 So. Madison, Wisconsin (La Follette)
37 Jonathan Lattimore CB 5–10 180 So. Austin, Texas (Westwood)
39 Chad Smith HB 5–10 185 Fr. River Oaks, Texas (Castleberry)
40 Trent White FB 5–10 235 So. Canton, Ohio (Massillon Jackson)
41 Travis Wittick FS 5–10 185 So. Rancho Santa Margarita, California (Mission Viejo)
42 Joey Keller ILB 6–2 230 So. Hastings, Michigan (Hastings)
43 Andrew Braley ILB 6–2 215 Jr. Valdosta, Georgia (Valdosta)
44 Rick Ricciardi ILB 6–1 235 So. Edwardsville, Illinois (Edwardsville)
45 Kenny Smith ILB 6–3 245 Sr. Kirtland, New Mexico (Kirtland Central)
47 Grant Scholl FS 6–1 200 So. Englewood, Colorado (Cherry Creek)
48 John Rudzinski ILB 6–2 235 Sr. Green Bay, Wisconsin (Notre Dame Academy)
49 Cameron Hodge ILB 6–2 230 Sr. Parker, Colorado (Ponderosa)
50 John Blake Peel C 6–2 265 Sr. San Antonio, Texas (Smithson Valley)
51 Marcus Brown ILB 6–2 240 Fr. Hephzibah, Georgia (Hephzibah)
53 Ryan Carter DE 6–2 250 Sr. Waterloo, Wisconsin (Edgewood)
54 Bryan Jones DS 6–1 235 So. Fort Walton Beach, Florida (Ft. Walton Beach)
55 Gilberto Perez NG 6–3 275 So. Tampa, Florida (Leto)
56 Jon Wilson OG/C 6–4 300 Jr. Tampa, Florida (Hillsborough)
57 Ross Weaver OT 6–7 295 Jr. Parker, Colorado (Ponderosa)
60 Stuart Perlow C 6–4 280 So. Lancaster, Ohio (Lancaster)
61 Tyler Dohallow OG 6–3 275 So. Conyers, Georgia (Salem)
62 Curtis Grantham OG 6–2 270 Jr. Aurora, Colorado (Overland Park)
63 Pat Edwards OG 6–2 260 Jr. Tallahassee, Florida (Lincoln)
64 Blaine Guenther OC 6–2 255 Fr. Graham, WA (Bethel)
65 Lawrence Hufford C/OG 6–1 280 Jr. Hamilton, Ohio (Badin)
67 Bob Scott OT 6–3 255 Jr. St. Louis, Missouri (Burroughs)
69 Caleb Morris OG/C 6–2 275 Fr. Spring, Texas (Spring)
70 Brian Jarratt OG 6–5 290 Sr. Three Rivers, Texas (Three Rivers)
72 Robert Kraay OT 6–8 285 So. Tucker, Georgia (Tucker)
74 Bert Thornton OT 6–5 300 Jr. Springfield, Missouri (Springfield Catholic)
75 Donald Whitt OT 6–5 290 So. DeSoto, Texas (DeSoto)
76 Joe McNulty OT 6–4 230 So. Lafayette, Louisiana (St. Thomas More)
77 Tyler Kimes OG 6–5 250 Jr. Eden Prairie, Minnesota (Eden Prairie)
78 Nelson Mitchell DE 6–1 260 Jr. Houston, Texas (St. Thomas)
80 Erik Anderson DE 6–8 280 Jr. Eden Prairie, Minnesota (Eden Prairie)
82 Alec Messerall WR 5–11 195 Sr. Alexandria, Ohio (Northridge)
83 J.P. Waller WR 6–2 205 Sr. Bryan, Texas (Bryan)
84 Chris Charron WR 6–2 200 Sr. Grand Island, Nebraska (Northwest)
85 Greg Kirkwood WR 6–2 205 Jr. Othello, WA (Othello)
86 Kevin Quinn DE 6–1 235 So. Westlake, Ohio (St. Edward)
87 Christopher Carp P 5-9 160 So. Katy, Texas (Katy)
88 Russ Mitscherling NG 6–3 285 Jr. Victoria, Texas (Memorial)
89 Noah Garguile TE 6–5 240 Fr. Bremerton, WA (Bremerton)
90 Chris Evans TE 6–2 240 Fr. San Antonio, Texas (Madison)
91 Robert McMenomy TE 6–4 235 Jr. Snellville, Georgia (South Gwinnett)
92 Dave Shaffer NG 6–3 280 Jr. Lakewood, Colorado (Green Mountain)
93 Michael Greenaway PK 5–10 180 Sr. Culpeper, Virginia (Culpeper County)
94 Carsten Stahr TE 6–3 245 Jr. Lincoln, Nebraska (Lincoln Christian)
95 Travis Dekker TE 6–4 235 Fr. Albuquerque, New Mexico (La Cueva)
96 Grant Thomas NG 6–1 275 So. Clovis, California (Buchanan)
97 Brendan Greenaway PK 6–3 200 So. Culpeper, Virginia (Culpeper County)
98 Chris Monson TE 6–4 250 Fr. White Bear Lake, Minnesota (White Bear Lake)
99 Nathan Terrazone DE 6–3 240 Sr. LaCrescenta, California (St. Francis)

References

Air Force
Air Force Falcons football seasons
Air Force Falcons football